Elections for the Territorial Assembly were held in French Dahomey on 30 March 1952. Sourou-Migan Apithy's Republican Party of Dahomey won 19 of the 32 second college seats. Only ten members of the Legislative Council elected in 1947 were re-elected.

Background
The Legislative Council had been created as part of the constitutional reforms that created French Fourth Republic. In 1952 it was converted into the Territorial Assembly, and was enlarged from 30 to 50 seats. The Assembly was elected by two electoral colleges; 18 by the first electoral college and 32 by the second.

Results

References

Elections in Benin
Dahomey
1952 in French Dahomey
Election and referendum articles with incomplete results
March 1952 events in Africa